Quintus Pomponius Musa was a magistrate, moneyer and banker during the Republican Period in Rome, around 66 BC.  He was a member of the Pomponia gens.

According to the National Museum of Scotland, moneyers commissioned designs, which often referred to famous ancestors, associations to favourite cults, or, as here, puns on their names. Musa created ten coin designs: one design for each of the nine Muses, a play on Musa's name; and one coin featuring the image of Hercules with the inscription HERCULES MUSARUM (Hercules of the Muses).  All ten designs depict the specific muse on the reverse, while featuring the image of Apollo on the obverse; Apollo presided over the Muses.

When Hercules is represented, he is called Hercules Musarum, or Musageta, that is, "The leader of the Muses." He was known by this name in Greece, and later in Rome, when his statue and those of the nine Muses were brought from Greece, and the temple erected there for their reception. On other coins of Quintus Pomponius Musa the nine Muses appear arranged in the usual order, each distinguished by her emblem. The most distinct figure is that Urania, from the Greek Ουρανος; she points with a staff to heaven, as the Muse of astronomy.

References

External links
Ancient Coins at the Elvehjem Museum of Art
National Museums of Scotland
Mercure romain By Bernard Combet Farnoux
The coin collector Manual by Henry Noel Humphreys

Moneyers of ancient Rome
Musa
1st-century BC Romans